Bourke Street is a 1886 painting by Australian artist Tom Roberts. Roberts originally titled the work Allegro con brio. The painting depicts the western end of Bourke Street, one of the main thoroughfares in Melbourne as seen from the Buckley & Nunn drapery.

The work was painted a few months after Roberts' return to Australia in 1885, after he had spent four years in Europe . It was not displayed until 1890, and only five days beforehand,  Roberts added three female figures to the lower left. Roberts was unable to find a buyer and handed the painting to fellow artist, Frederick McCubbin. In 1920, McCubbin's widow sold the painting to the Commonwealth Parliamentary Library for 20 guineas—forwarding the proceeds to Roberts, who was in London at the time.

References

External links
Tom Roberts Allegro con brio: Bourke Street west Turner to Monet: The Triumph of Landscape

Paintings by Tom Roberts
Collections of the National Gallery of Australia
1886 paintings